Sofia Zacharaki (born 1976) is a Greek teacher and politician. She is Deputy Minister of Tourism in the government of Kyriakos Mitsotakis.

Biography
She was born in Athens in 1976, originally from Granitsa, Evrytania. Her father was a theologian teacher in secondary education.

She studied English Philology at the Department of English Language and Philology of the School of Philosophy of the National and Kapodistrian University of Athens and did postgraduate studies in Comparative Pedagogy and Administration of European Educational Organizations at the National and Kapodistrian University.

She specializes in English language teaching at the University of London's Institute of Education. In the past, she had worked in public and private vocational schools and in public and private schools. Worked for the Ministry of Education in the European Union and the Secretariat for Lifelong Learning and Youth.

In 2015, she represented Greece in the IVLP (International Visitor Leadership Program), as a fellow of the United States Department of State, on "the role of Public-Private Partnerships in the reconstruction of Finance."

She speaks English, French and Spanish.

Politics
She served as Advisor to the Minister for International and European Relations at the Ministry of Development from 2012 to 2014.

In August 2016, she was appointed Deputy Spokesperson of New Democracy, while in March 2019, she was appointed Spokesperson of New Democracy.

On July 9, 2019, she was appointed Deputy Minister of Education and Religious Affairs, responsible for primary and secondary education, in the government of Kyriakos Mitsotakis.

On January 4, 2021, she was appointed Deputy Minister of Tourism in charge of Tourism Education and Special Forms of Tourism.

References

1976 births
Living people
Greek educators
Politicians from Athens